The Astound Broadband Stadium is a 15,000-seat (18,000 capacity) stadium located in Midland, Texas. The stadium plays host to the American football and soccer teams for both Legacy High School and Midland High School, plus the Midland-Odessa FC franchise in soccer's Premier Development League, the West Texas Drillers adult tackle football team in the Minor Professional Football League (MPFL) as well as the West Texas Pride Minor League Football team of the Rio Grande Football League (RGFL)

The stadium is part of the Scharbauer Sports Complex, together with the 5,000-seat Security Bank Ballpark.

The reason behind the stadium's rather large size for a high school venue is the incredible passion for high school football in Texas.  Ratliff Stadium in neighboring Odessa is another large high school stadium, which seated nearly 20,000 before renovations to comply with the Americans with Disabilities Act reduced capacity to 17,500.

External links
 Stadium Info at Midland Lee athletics (includes photos)
 Scharbauer Sports Complex at Google Maps

High school football venues in Texas
Soccer venues in Texas
Sports venues in Texas
2002 establishments in Texas
Sports venues completed in 2002
National Premier Soccer League stadiums